The 2013 international cricket season is from April 2013 to September 2013.

Season overview

Rankings
The following are the rankings at the start of the season.

 Notes
 Zimbabwe are currently unranked in Tests, as they have played insufficient matches. They have 263 points and a rating of 38.

April

World Cricket League Division Seven

Final Placings

The Netherlands in Namibia

Bangladesh in Zimbabwe

Kenya vs Netherlands in Namibia

Twenty20 Quadrangular in Namibia

World Cricket League Division Three

Final Placings

May

New Zealand in England

Pakistan in Scotland

Pakistan in Ireland

South Africa in the Netherlands

June

ICC Champions Trophy

Group stage

West Indies Triangular Series

Kenya in Scotland

July

Ireland in the Netherlands

Pakistan women in England

Pakistan women against Ireland in England

Australia in England

Pakistan in the West Indies

Pakistan women in Ireland

South Africa in Sri Lanka

World Cricket League Division Six

Final Placings

India in Zimbabwe

August

United Arab Emirates in Canada

Afghanistan in Namibia

Australia women in England

The Netherlands in Canada

Pakistan in Zimbabwe

September

England in Ireland

Australia in Scotland

Scotland in Ireland

Bangladesh women in South Africa

References

External links
 2013 season on ESPN Cricinfo

 
2013 in cricket